Trichoceridae, or winter crane flies, of the order Diptera are long, thin, delicate insects superficially similar in appearance to the Tipulidae, Tanyderidae, and Ptychopteridae. The presence of ocelli distinguishes the Trichoceridae from these other families.  There are approximately 160 known species. The adults can be found flying in the fall and the spring and some are active even in the winter, hence their common name. They form dancing, loose swarms of mostly males. Adults can also be found resting inside caves and hollow logs.  Larvae occur in moist habitats where they feed on decaying vegetable matter. They are of no economic importance.

Range 
Distributed globally. Most Trichoceridae species are found in non-tropical regions (Holarctic regions). There are 27 species in North America.

Description 
Besides Trichoceridae, there are very few insects that appear in adult form during winter months. They are usually seen in the fall or early spring and can be seen on mild winter days. Adult Trichoceridae are medium-sized flies that are hard to distinguish in the field. Aside from the presence of ocelli, they have a V-shaped suture on the mesonotum and distinct wing venation (if present). Larvae are also found in colder months throughout the year. They live in decaying vegetable matter and can be distinguished by their well-developed head capsule, amphineustic spiracular arrangement, and are oblique/vertical.

References

Further reading
Borror, D.J., C.A. Triplehorn, & N.A. Johnson. 1989. An Introduction to the Study of Insects, Sixth edition. Saunders College Publishing.
Krzemińska, E. 1991.  Trichoceridae. Checklist of Animals of Poland. Vol. II. J. Razowski, ed. Wrocław-Warszawa-Kraków. Ossolineum, Polish Academy of Sciences.
Krzemińska, E. 1995. Trichoceridae. Checklist delle specie della fauna Italiana. Vol. 62-65. Pp. 17–39. Edizioni Calderini.
Krzemińska, E. 1996. Trichoceridae. Brand-Stof. Een inventarisatie van der entomofauna van het Natuurreservaat "De Brand" in 1990. J. W. A. van Zuijlen, T. M. J. Peeters, P. S. van Wielink, A. P. W. van Eck, & E. H. M. Bouvy, eds. Insektenwerkgroep KNNV-afdeling Tillburg. Pp. 97–98.
Pratt, H.D. 2003. The winter crane flies of North America north of Mexico (Diptera: Trichoceridae). Proceedings of the Entomological Society of Washington, 105: 901–914.
Triplehorn, Charles A., Norman Johnson F., and Donald Borror J. Borror and DeLong's Introduction to the Study of Insects. 7th ed. Belmont, CA: Thompson Brooks/Cole, 2005. 
Petrašiūnas, Andrius, and Gunnar Kvifte Mikalsen. "New Records of Trichoceridae (Diptera) from the Island of Mallorca." Biodiversity Data Journal, Vol. 4, Issue 4. 21 Jan. 2016.
“The oldest Polyneura (Diptera) and their importance to the phylogeny of the group,” Wieslaw Krzeminski 1991.

External links 
Bishop Museum Fossil Insect Catalog
Family Trichoceridae at Bishop Museum
Photograph of adult
Images from BugGuide

Nematocera families
Tipulomorpha